Alireza Monazzemi (born 14 December 2002) is an Iranian footballer who plays as a midfielder for Nassaji Mazandaran in the Persian Gulf Pro League.

Club career

Zob Ahan
He made his debut for Zob Ahan in 16th fixtures of 2018–19 Iran Pro League against Nassaji Mazandaran while he substituted in for Amir Arsalan Motahari.

References

External links
Official Website
Alireza Monazami at Instagram

2002 births
Living people
Iranian footballers
Zob Ahan Esfahan F.C. players
Association football midfielders
People from Abadan, Iran
Sportspeople from Khuzestan province